Vachakbud may refer to:
 Vachakbud-e Olya
 Vachakbud-e Sofla